Hermann Kutter (1863–1931) was a Swiss Protestant theologian. Together with Leonhard Ragaz, he was one of the founders of Christian socialism in Switzerland. He was heavily influenced by Christoph Blumhardt. He combined Blumhardt's expectation of a coming Kingdom of God with a belief in socialist progress. He saw social democracy as a "tool" of the living God, and its followers as unwitting servants of God. He authored 11 books.

Biography 

Kutter was born at Bern on 12 September 1863, the son of Wilhelm Rudolf Kutter (1818–1888), an engineer, and Marie Albertina König (1833–1923). He married Lydia Rohner (1868–1936) in 1892. He grew up in a pietistic home and studied theology in Basel, Bern, and Berlin. In 1894 he became a pastor in Vinelz (Bielersee), 1898 in Zürich (Neumünster). He died on 31 March 1931 in St. Gallen.

Philosophy 
Under the impression of a combination of the Christian expectation of the Kingdom of God, the life philosophies of the time, and the socialistic faith in the future of the younger Blumhardt, as well as the philosophy of German idealism, Kutter reached a dynamic view of God: God, who through Christ penetrates humankind and the world in eternal reality is the only reality of life. With this theocentric theology Kutter paved the way for so-called "dialectical theology" (Karl Barth, Emil Brunner, Eduard Thurneysen). For Kutter, the return to "direct life" is completed in the history of humankind; socialism is a sign of this. But for Kutter this return to the direct is at the same time the meaning and goal of Christendom. For him, social democrats are instruments of the living God; "they must" proclaim to the world the judgment and the great turning point in their service to God, without realizing it themselves. Nonetheless, Kutter never joined the Social Democratic Party (as Leonhard Ragaz and Karl Barth did); neither did he identify the gospel with socialism.

He was a pacifist.

References

External links 
'They Must' by Hermann Kutter (1908) Online
 Internet Archive: Details: They must; or God and the social democracy: a frank word to christian men and women at www.archive.org
Works by Hermann Kutter https://openlibrary.org/authors/OL1246376A/Hermann_Kutter

1863 births
1931 deaths
Calvinist and Reformed Christian socialists
Calvinist pacifists
People from Bern
Swiss Christian socialists
Swiss Calvinist and Reformed theologians
Christian socialist theologians
Swiss Christian pacifists